Henderson Stadium is a stadium in Lorman, Mississippi.  It hosted the Alcorn State University Braves football team until the school moved to Jack Spinks Stadium in 1992.  The stadium held 10,000 people at its peak.  It currently hosts the school's track and field squad.

External links
 Venue information

Defunct college football venues
American football venues in Mississippi
Alcorn State Braves football
Buildings and structures in Claiborne County, Mississippi